The College Inn Bar is the oldest established business in Douglas, Wyoming and Converse County to survive in its original location. Established in 1906 by Theodore (Llee) Pringle, succeeding an 1887 bar known as "Lee Pringle's." The 1906 structure is a two-story masonry building, occupying the site of the frame Pringle's bar, which was moved two blocks away and which still survives.

The bar, made by the Brunswick-Balke Calendar Company of Chicago, features elaborate woodwork, with a mirrored marble and wood backbar. The mirrors were painted with western scenes in 1953. The barroom features taxidermy mounts and an arched vision screen with stained glass inserts, crowned by two stuffed golden eagles. Beyond the barroom is a lounge that used to feature ten curtained private booths, removed during Prohibition. The lounge retains call buttons and painted murals.

The second floor originally had nine elaborately-furnished guest rooms, with a tenth room for gambling. The building's structure incorporates railroad steel and steel cables in an early attempt at reinforced concrete. The basement served as a storeroom for liquor and beer.

The College Inn Bar was placed on the National Register of Historic Places on July 10, 1979.

References

External links
 College Inn Bar at the Wyoming State Historic Preservation Office

Commercial buildings completed in 1906
Buildings and structures in Converse County, Wyoming
Drinking establishments on the National Register of Historic Places in Wyoming
National Register of Historic Places in Converse County, Wyoming
1906 establishments in Wyoming